Pender may refer to:

Places
 Pender, Nebraska
 Pender County, North Carolina
 Pender Island, British Columbia
 Pender Township, Thurston County, Nebraska
 Joseph John Pender House, in Wilson County, North Carolina

People
 Baron Pender, a title in the Peerage of the United Kingdom
 Daniel Pender, Royal Navy Staff Commander, later captain
 David Pender, former American football player
 Derek Pender, Irish association footballer
 Harold Pender, American academic, author, and inventor
 John Pender, Scottish submarine communications cable pioneer and politician
 Mark Pender, American trumpetist
 Mel Pender, American sprinter
 Paul Pender, American boxer and fire-fighter from Massachusetts
 Peter Pender, American bridge player
 Robert Pender, American professional baseball player, manager and umpire
 William Dorsey Pender, Confederate general in the American Civil War

Schools 

Pender Early College High School, North Carolina
 Pender High School, North Carolina

Locomotives
No. 3 Pender, an 1873 locomotive of the Isle of Man Railway

See also
 
Prendergast (surname)